The Himalayan marmot (Marmota himalayana) is a marmot species that inhabits alpine grasslands throughout the Himalayas and on the Tibetan Plateau. It is IUCN Red Listed as Least Concern because of its wide range and possibly large population.

Taxonomy 
Arctomys Himalayanus was the scientific name proposed by Brian Houghton Hodgson in 1841 who described marmot skins from the Himalayas. In the 19th century, several Himalayan marmot specimens were described and proposed as subspecies.

The Himalayan marmot is very closely related to the Tarbagan marmot (M. sibirica) and somewhat more distantly to the—in morphology rather different—black-capped marmot (M. camtschatica). These three form a species group and its nearest relative is the bobak species group, which includes the bobak marmot (M. bobak) itself, as well as the gray (M. baibacina) and forest-steppe marmots (M. kastschenkoi). In the past, the relatively short-furred and short-tailed marmots of the Palearctic region, i.e. Himalayan, Tarbagan, gray and forest-steppe, all were regarded as subspecies of the bobak marmot.

Characteristics 

The Himalayan marmot has a dense woolly fur that is rufous grey on the back and rufous yellowish on ears, belly and limbs. The bridge of its nose and end of tail is dark brown. It is one of the largest marmots in the world, being about the size of a large housecat.

Distribution and habitat 

In China, it has been recorded in Xinjiang, Qinghai, Gansu, Xizang, western Sichuan and Yunnan provinces. In the west its distribution reaches that of the long-tailed marmot (M. caudata), but the two are not known to hybridize. The Himalayan marmot lives in short grass steppes or alpine habitats, typically above the tree line but below the permanent snow limit.

Ecology and behaviour

The Himalayan marmot lives in colonies and excavates deep burrows that colony members share during hibernation. The species hibernates from the late autumn to the early spring, on average for 7 months. The marmot eats plants growing on pastures, in particular the soft and juicy parts of grassy plant species like Carex, Agrostis, Deschampsia, Koeleria  and flowering species like Euphrasia, Gentiana, Halenia, Polygonum, Primula, Ranunculus, Saussurea, Taraxacum Iris potaninii.

Reproduction 
Females become sexually mature at the age of two years. After one month of gestation they give birth to litters of two to 11 young.

Predators 
On the Tibetan plateau, marmot species form part of snow leopard prey. Other predators of Himalayan marmots include Tibetan wolves,  red fox, and large birds of prey like hawks, kestrels, bearded vultures, and golden eagles.

In culture 
It was known to the ancient Greek writers as the gold-digging ant apparently as reference to the fact that gold nuggets were found in the silts of the burrows these marmots dug. The French ethnologist Michel Peissel claimed that the story of 'gold-digging ants' reported by the Greek historian Herodotus was founded on the golden Himalayan marmot of the Deosai plateau and the habit of local tribes such as the Minaro to collect the gold dust excavated from their burrows.

A photograph of a Himalayan marmot under attack by a Tibetan fox taken by Bao Yongqing won the overall prize in the 2019 Wildlife Photographer of the Year award.

See also 
 Long-tailed marmot

References 

Marmots
Fauna of the Himalayas
Mammals of Tibet
Mammals of Bhutan
Rodents of India
Mammals described in 1841
Rodents of Pakistan
Rodents of China